1816–1830 , edited and published from 1816 to 1830 by F. G. Levrault commenced Charles Dumont de Sainte-Croix was a notable ornithological contributor.
Duchesse de Berry, daughter-in-law of King Charles X of France, extends her patronage to the illustrator Pancrace Bessa
Other birds described by Vieillot in the same issue include the black-chested buzzard-eagle, the Mindanao wrinkled hornbill, the speckled teal the ringed teal and the South American snipe
William John Swainson accompanies the explorer Henry Koster to Brazil. He returned to England in 1818 about 760 bird skins.
Pictou Academy founded. The institute had a natural history museum which was later (1833) admired by John James Audubon
French Academy of Sciences becomes autonomous.
Carl Ludwig Koch publishes .
HMS Congo expedition.

References 

Birding and ornithology by year
1816 in science